Jack Morelli (born October 26, 1962) is an American comic book letterer and author, also credited under the name John Morelli. He has designed many comic book logos. His lettering is notable for being the basis for the computer font used by John Byrne when he letters his own work.

Morelli was a staff letterer at Marvel  during the 1980s, where he was known by the affectionate nickname "Squid" (because he had once worked on a fishing boat).

During this time, Morelli also worked in editorial and wrote some comics, most notably the 1998 Peter Parker Annual featuring Elektra, where he created the enigmatic supervillain The Silencer.

Morelli has also worked for DC Comics and Archie Comics.

In 2007, Morelli and Mark Chiarello authored Heroes of the Negro Leagues, published by Abrams, Inc., a book about the history of Negro league baseball. It was named the second best sports book of 2007 by Amazon.com.

Morelli won the 2015 Harvey Award for Best Letterer for his work on Afterlife with Archie.

Personal life 
Morelli is an avid weightlifter, and during the 1980s some Marvel staffers thought he looked like Namor, the Sub-Mariner.

References

External links

Jack Morelli on ComicVine
 

Living people
1962 births